10x or 10X may refer to:

 10x Management, an American talent management company 
 10x Genomics, an American biotechnology company 
 Windows 10X, an abandoned edition of Microsoft's operating system